Thomas Diethart (born 25 February 1992) is an Austrian former ski jumper who won the 2014 Four Hills Tournament.

Career
Diethart's debut in the FIS Ski Jumping World Cup took place in January 2011 in Innsbruck. He won his first podium, a third place, in Oberstdorf in 2013.
His first world cup win took place just a few days later in Garmisch-Partenkirchen, when he won against his teammate Thomas Morgenstern and the Swiss Simon Ammann. After a 5th place in Innsbruck, he proceeded to win his second world cup jump in Bischofshofen, which also meant the triumph of the well-respected Four Hills Tournament.

Diethart competed for Austria at the 2014 Winter Olympics in Sochi, Russia in men's ski jumping in both the individual normal hill and large hill events. In the normal hill he qualified for the finals and placed fourth, while, in the large hill he did not qualify for the finals and placed 32nd.   Then as part of the Austrian team along with Michael Hayböck,
Thomas Morgenstern and Gregor Schlierenzauer he took a silver in the team large hill competition at the same games.

World Cup

Standings

Wins

External links 

1992 births
Living people
Austrian male ski jumpers
Ski jumpers at the 2014 Winter Olympics
Olympic ski jumpers of Austria
Olympic silver medalists for Austria
Olympic medalists in ski jumping
Medalists at the 2014 Winter Olympics
People from Tulln an der Donau
21st-century Austrian people